Hunar-nāma ('the book of excellence', also transliterated Honarnāme) is a 487-distich Persian mathnavī poem composed by ‘Uthmān Mukhtārī at Tabas in the period 500-508 (1105-13 CE), when he was at the court of Seljuqs in Kirmān. The poem is dedicated to the ruler of Tabas, Yamīn al-Dowla (aka Ḥisām ad-Dīn Yamīn ad-Dowla Shams al-Ma‘ālī Abū ’l-Muẓaffar Amīr Ismā‘īl Gīlakī, and can be read as a 'letter of application' demonstrating Mukhtārī's skill as a court poet. It has been characterised as 'perhaps the most interesting of the poems dedicated to Gīlākī'.

Form
The poem is unique among masnavīs for portraying a young poet being tested, not by a more senior poet as in other medieval Persian poems, but by an astrologer. Moreover, is also unique for including a series of riddles (ten in all) on the spiritual, intellectual, and military ideals for a king. These in turn have a distinctive structure: each has ten distichs posing ethical questions, followed by two distichs in which the poet delivers his answers. The riddles in particular serve to showcase Mukhtārī's virtuosity in poetic description. The poem is also among the earliest to have been written in the khafīf metre.

Contents

The poem begins of a cosmological survey, which descends from heaven to earth before culminating in praise of God and his Prophet. The second half of the poem narrates the reverse process: the striving of the poet's persona to proceed from a mundane existence to spiritual perfection. He achieves this by going on a journey and meeting an astrologer, who tests his wisdom with riddles 

As translated by A. A. Seyed-Gohrab, the contents of the Hunar-nāma are:

 [A description of heaven]
 The twelve signs of the zodiac (davāzdah burj)
 The dispositions of the signs of the zodiac (ṭabāyi‘-i burūj)
 The seven planets and the extent of their annual movements (haft kowkab-i sayyāra bā miqdār-i ḥarikat-i sāliyāna)
 The influence of the moon and the sun (vilāyat-i māh-u āftāb)
 The houses of the stars (khāna-hā-yi kavākib)
 The generation of the seven fathers and the four mothers (mavālid-i haft pidar-u chahār mādar)
 A comparison of the four elements to the four humours [blood, phlegm, yellow and black bile] and the four seasons of the year (taṭbīq-i chahār ‘unṣur bā ikhlāt-i arba‘a va chahār faṣl-i sāl): fire (ātash), wind (bād), water (āb), earth (khāk)
 The three stages of generation (mavālid-i si-gāna): minerals (ma‘danī), vegetative (giyāhān), animals (jānivarān)
 Man's superiority over other animals (faẓīlat-i ādamī bar dīgar jānivarān)
 The Creator (āfarīdigār)
 The prophets (peyghāmbarān)
 In praise of the leader of Prophets, Muḥammad the Chosen, peace be upon him, and of his companions (na‘t-i sayyid-i anbiyā’ Muḥammad-i Muṣṭafā ‘alayih as-salām va yārānash)
 The desire to attain human perfection and the search for the Perfect Man (ārizū-yi risīdan ba kamāl-i insānī va justijū-yi mardān-i kāmil)
 The reason for travelling (sahab-i musāfirat)
 The guidance of the astrologer, with reference to the advantages of travelling (rahnimūn-yi sitāra-shinās bā ishārat ba favā’id-i musāfirat)
 Questions and answers with the astrologer (pursish u pāsukh bā sitāra-shinās)
 Speech and rhetoric (sukhan u sukhan-shinās)
 In praise of the leader of commanders, Yamīn ad-Dowla (Madḥ-i Sayyid al-umarā’ Yamīn ad-Dowla Ḥisām ad-Dīn Shams al-Ma‘ālī Abū ’l-Muẓaffar Amīr Ismā‘īl-i Gīlakī)
 Character-testing by solving poetic enigmas and riddles (āzmāyish-i ṭab‘ ba ḥall-i rumūz va alghāz-i shā‘irāna)
 On high [spiritual] aspirations (himmat-i buland)
 The virile reign (dowlat-t javān)
 On a distinguished name (nām-i arjumand)
 The open and generous hand (dast-i gushāda-yi bakhshanda)
 Riddle on a pen (chīstān-i qalam)
 Riddle on a sword (chīstān-i shamshīr)
 Riddle on a lance (chīstān-i nayza)
 Riddle on the quality of the bow and arrow (chīstān dar ṣifat-i tīr-u kamān)
 Riddle on the quality of a horse (chīstān dar ṣifat-i asb)
 Riddle on the quality of the bounteous banquet and the breadth of the Prince's generosity (chīstān dar ṣifat-i khwān-i karam va sufra-yi jūd-i mamdūḥ)
 The astrologer's speech after the character test (guftār-i sitāra-shinās pas az azmāyish-t ṭab‘)
 The end of the poem: praising and praying for the Praised One, and explaining the poet's conditions and wishes (khātama-yi mathnavĩ: dar madḥ va du‘ā-yi mamdūḥ va bayān-i aḥvāl va āmāl-i shā‘ir)

Sources and influences

Though rather different, the Hunar-nāma may have drawn some inspiration from the Rowshanā’ī-namā by Nāṣir-i Khusrow (d. 1075). It may in turn have inspired Sanā’ī's Ḥadīqat al-ḥaqīqa, Seyr al-‘ibād, and Kār-nāma. The testing of the poet's wisdom recalls similar tests of young men's wits in Persian epic and romance texts such as Khosrow ud Redak, Asadī's Garshāsp-nāma, and Firdow's Shāh-nāma.

Editions and translations

 Humā’ī, Jalāl ad-Dīn, Funūn-i balāghat va ṣanā‘at-i adabī (Tehran, 1975) [critical edition]
 Seyed-Gohrab, A. A., Courtly Riddles: Enigmatic Embellishments in Early Persian Poetry'' (Leiden: Leiden University Press, 2010), pp. 156-99 includes translations of the riddles.

References

Persian literature